The 1936 French Championships (now known as the French Open) was a tennis tournament that took place on the outdoor clay courts at the Stade Roland-Garros in Paris, France. The tournament ran from 24 May until 1 June. It was the 41st staging of the French Championships and the second Grand Slam tournament of the year.

Finals

Men's singles

 Gottfried von Cramm defeated  Fred Perry 6–0, 2–6, 6–2, 2–6, 6–0

Women's singles

 Hilde Sperling defeated  Simonne Mathieu  6–3, 6–4

Men's doubles
 Jean Borotra /  Marcel Bernard defeated  Charles Tuckey /  Pat Hughes  6–2, 3–6, 9–7, 6–1

Women's doubles
 Simonne Mathieu  /  Billie Yorke defeated  Susan Noel /  Jadwiga Jędrzejowska 2–6, 6–4, 6–4

Mixed doubles
 Billie Yorke /  Marcel Bernard  defeated  Sylvie Jung Henrotin /  André Martin-Legeay  7–5, 6–8, 6–3

References

External links
 French Open official website

French Championships
French Championships (tennis) by year
French champ
French Championships (tennis)
French Championships (tennis)
French Championships (tennis)